The Coloured Squadrons of the Royal Navy  were first introduced in the Tudor Period during the reign of Queen Elizabeth I of England (1558-1603) The purpose was to separate the English fleet into three squadrons for better command and control, though in 1596 there were four squadrons. In 1620 as the fleet was expanding the system was changed to include three squadrons but also three sub divisions. Assigned to each of these squadrons were flag officers who were separated in terms of their seniority by the use of coloured flags: in effect the squadrons provided a system of designating the nine or ten most senior admirals of the Royal Navy until the system was abolished in 1864. Squadrons and divisions continued to be used as system of managing large formations when the British navy consisted of more than one fleet for most of the twentieth century until 1971.

History
Historically, the English fleet was first divided into three squadrons distinguished by colour in 1558, the Admiral of the English fleet, the Lord Admiral of England's squadron, flew a plain red flag as its ensign. The Vice-Admiral of the fleet, or Vice-Admiral of England, flew a plain blue flag, and the Rear-Admiral of the fleet flew a plain white flag. Order of precedence was red, blue, and white until May 1596.

In June 1596 the English fleet was divided into four squadrons for the expedition for the Capture of Cádiz. The fleet during this expedition had joint commanders-in-chief styled as "Joint Generalls of the Armies by Sea and Land". Naval forces were under the command of the Lord Admiral of England, Charles Howard, 1st Earl of Nottingham whose squadron was in the centre, whilst land forces were under the command of the General of the Army, Robert Devereux, 2nd Earl of Essex whose squadron was also in the centre. The van squadron, or front, was commanded by the Vice Admiral of the Fleet (Vice-Admiral of England). The rear squadron (called the wyng) was commanded by the Rear-Admiral of the Fleet. After this expedition the system returned to a three squadron fleet.

In 1620 these squadrons had grown to the point where they could not be managed effectively by one admiral alone. This led to the introduction of a new system whereby squadrons were further subdivided into three subdivisions, each then led by three admirals of different ranks. Admiral was the senior rank, followed by Vice-Admiral and Rear-Admiral. In 1620 flag ranks were formally established in terms of promotion. From 1620 until 1652 the order of precedence of the squadrons was Red, Blue and White, until 1653, when the order of precedence was changed to red, white, and blue. In 1688 the permanent rank of Admiral of the Fleet was created, replacing the Lord High Admiral England operationally as commander-in-chief.

In 1805, after the battle of Trafalgar, the rank of Admiral of the Red was introduced. It became the highest rank that an Admiral could attain until 1862, when an allowance was made for more than one Admiral of the Fleet to be appointed. In 1864 the colour squadron organisation was abolished and the Royal Navy adopted the White Ensign of the former White Squadron. The Red Ensign of the Red Squadron became the ensign of the British Merchant Navy, and the Blue Ensign of the Blue Squadron became the ensign of the Auxiliary Fleet.

Squadron colours (1558–1596)
Included:

Squadron colours (1596)
During expedition to capture Cadiz with the aid of the Dutch (in 1 squadron) in June 1596 the English fleet was divided into 4 squadrons which had joint commander in chiefs naval forces were commanded by the Lord Admiral whilst land forces were commander by the General of the Army each allocated corresponding flags to differentiate them as shown below.

Lord Admirals squadron (centre)
Included:

General of the Army's squadron (centre)
Included:

Vice-Admiral of England's squadron (van/front)
Included:

Rear-Admiral of the Fleet's squadron (wyng/rear)
Included:

Red squadron centre (1596-1864)
Included:

The senior (red) squadron was usually placed in the centre of the line of battle, and always led by the commander-in-chief of the fleet, initially the Admiral of England, later called Lord Admiral until the creation of the rank of Admiral of the Fleet in 1688. During this period his van division was led by the Vice Admiral England (Red) and his rear division by the Rear Admiral of England  (Red). From 1688 the Admiral of the Fleet's van division was led by the Vice Admiral of the Red and his rear division by the Rear Admiral of the Red. In 1805 the rank of Admiral of Red was created; the van and rear commands remained the same.

White squadron van/front (1596–1864)
Included:

The white squadron, ranked second and generally placed in the van, would be commanded by the Admiral of the White, and its subdivisions would be led by a Vice Admiral of the White (van), and a Rear Admiral of the White (rear).

Blue squadron wyng/rear (1596–1864)
Included:

The blue squadron, ranked third or junior, was similarly commanded with an Admiral, Vice Admiral and Rear Admiral of the Blue, each flying a blue ensign.

Flag officers and commodores promotion pathway within squadrons

Promotion of Admirals also took place in this order - a Rear-Admiral of the Blue on promotion became a Rear-Admiral of the White as his first flag promotion. Once he had reached Rear-Admiral of the Red, on his next promotion he became a Vice-Admiral of the Blue and so on, until he finally became an Admiral of the White. It was only in the Red squadron that the hierarchy was not followed. There was no Admiral of the Red since this would be
deemed as being in overall command of the whole fleet until the rank was introduced in 1805. Until 1862 there could only be one Admiral of the Fleet.

1620 to 1804
 Rear-Admiral of the Blue became Rear-Admiral of the White as his next promotion
 Rear-Admiral of the White became Rear-Admiral of the Red as his next promotion
 Rear-Admiral of the Red became Vice-Admiral of the Blue as his next promotion
 Vice-Admiral of the Blue became Vice-Admiral of the White as his next promotion
 Vice-Admiral of the White became Vice-Admiral of the Red as his next promotion
 Vice-Admiral of the Red became Admiral of the Blue as his next promotion
 Admiral of the Blue became Admiral of the White as his next promotion
 Admiral of the White became Admiral of the Fleet as his next promotion

 1805 to 1864
 Rear-Admiral of the Blue became Rear-Admiral of the White as his next promotion
 Rear-Admiral of the White became Rear-Admiral of the Red as his next promotion
 Rear-Admiral of the Red became Vice-Admiral of the Blue as his next promotion
 Vice-Admiral of the Blue became Vice-Admiral of the White as his next promotion
 Vice-Admiral of the White became Vice-Admiral of the Red as his next promotion
 Vice-Admiral of the Red became Admiral of the Blue as his next promotion
 Admiral of the Blue became Admiral of the White as his next promotion
 Admiral of the White became Admiral of the Red as his next promotion
 Admiral of the Red became Admiral of the Fleet as his next promotion

See also
 List of command flags of the Royal Navy

Footnotes

Bibliography
 Heathcote, T. A. (2002). British Admirals of the Fleet: 1734-1995. Barnsley, England: Pen and Sword. .
 Information sheet no 55 Squadron Colours" (PDF). National Museum of the Royal Navy. 2014. Retrieved 26 February 2019.
 "Naval Ranks". www.nmrn-portsmouth.org.uk. National Museum of the Royal Navy. 2015. Retrieved 26 February 2019.
 Perrin, W. G. (William Gordon) (1922). "Flags of Command". British flags, their early history, and their development at sea; with an account of the origin of the flag as a national device. Cambridge, England: Cambridge : The University Press.
 The National Archives:Trafalgar Ancestors,Glossary, Admiral. www.nationalarchives.gov.uk. Kew, London, England: The National Archives UK.
 The Orders in Council for the Regulation of the Naval Service. (1864). London, England: Harrison and Sons.
 Wragg, David (2012). "National Entries". The World Sea Power Guide. Barnsley, England: Pen and Sword. .

Royal Navy squadrons